Eretz Acheret (“A Different Place”) is an independent, not-for-profit organization in Israel that produces a bi-monthly Hebrew magazine, periodic English magazines, a bilingual website, and conferences. Each magazine is dedicated to a selected topic, and the conferences around publication of each issue supplement the magazines. The most recent issue, produced in May–June 2010, focused on the issue of land privatization in Israel, and the accompanying conference was held at the Van Leer Institute in Jerusalem on June 24, 2010.

Philosophy
Bambi Sheleg is the founder and editor-in-chief. Sheleg worked as a journalist for the Israeli daily Ma'ariv for many years before founding Eretz Acheret and had her own news commentary corner on Channel 2 television news.
Eretz Acheret is a not-for-profit publication that is free from what Sheleg calls a “media of distraction” that concentrates on scandals, celebrity and hype. Eretz Acheret seeks to de-emphasize stories about extremism in an attempt to find a common social agenda for all sectors of Israel society.

History
Since 2000, Eretz Acheret has produced a bi-monthly magazine highlighting the work of people and organizations working towards renewal and change. In addition, Eretz Acheret facilitates conferences, discussions and other forums for cultural dialogue and debate on topics that parallel those discussed in the magazine. Eretz Acheret also hosts an English content website and plans to publish a tri-lingual Internet magazine in English, Hebrew and Arabic.

References

External links
 Eretz Acheret Official Site
 Avichai
 Jewish Agency

Non-profit organizations based in Israel